Adriano Manfred Laaber,  better known as Adrianinho (Jundiai, July 11, 1980), is a Brazilian footballer who plays for Fort Lauderdale Strikers in the North American Soccer League.

Career

Adriano Manfred Laaber is half-handed style creator. Revealed by Ponte Preta and Corinthians and Flamengo crossings, was hired by Brasiliense.

In 2003, when he was still undecided about his international career, came to the attention of the Austrian national team, the country of his father. However, although he accepted the invitation of the Austrian team (which would have made him the first Brazilian to play for them), did not play for them.

He was signed by Ponte Preta when he was only 18 years old, and eventually gained the status of a promising player, which made Corinthians sign him and also later, Flamengo.

The player Paulo Adrianinho that although Brazilian by birth, is an Austrian-born, has emerged in the Joao Havelange Cup, a tournament that replaced the Brazilian championship in 2000, working for the modest Ponte Preta. At that time the team arrived at the interior of an unlikely event in seventh place, and did draw attention to the then puny half.

Expert free kick taker and corner kicks, dribbling in small spaces, linked to good kicks left leg did just that Adrianinho was tipped to take even a place in the Austria squad, because the young half, had the last name and ascedência direct (coming from his father) in that country.

The promises to start a work based on selections from Austria did not materialize, despite this, in 2004, Adrianinho had his first big break as a player, to be hired by the Corinthians. After a team from the beginning overwhelming, midfielder suffered a sharp drop in production and, after only one semester, was dismissed from the Parque São Jorge and headed Paysandu.

He disputed the Campeonato Brasileiro 2004 at Paysandu, and in 2005 he was invited to play in Brazil's Most Wanted. He arrived at Gavia, moreover, with the purpose of wearing the number 10 shirt, previously worn by Zico, and moral to take the wave of supportive team then headed by Julio Cesar Leal.

However, over time show that Adrianinho was just one of over twenty players hired by the club in season 2005. Low productivity caused his original contract, the risk does not last longer than the first four months allowed. The trigger for its withdrawal, was the arrival of Celso Roth, who face the situation of the athlete, did not hesitate to ask for his head, considering the quality of the half as unsatisfactory. He went to Vila Nova and later that year on loan to OFI, Greece. Half a year in Europe and after only five performances, Adrianinho returned to Vila Nova.

Later moved to Jaipur in 2006, though by Ceara and Brasiliense, in none of these clubs, managed to recapture the good times of football Macaca.

Career statistics
(Correct )

according to combined sources on the Flamengo official website and Flaestatística.

Contract
 Brasiliense.

References

External links

Flapédia
zerozerofootball.com

1980 births
Living people
Brazilian footballers
Campeonato Brasileiro Série A players
Campeonato Brasileiro Série B players
Associação Atlética Ponte Preta players
Sport Club Corinthians Paulista players
CR Flamengo footballers
Brasiliense Futebol Clube players
Austrian footballers
Brazilian people of Austrian descent
Fort Lauderdale Strikers players
North American Soccer League players
Association football midfielders
People from Jundiaí
Footballers from São Paulo (state)